The Hydrographers Range is a forested mountain range in the Oro Province of southeastern Papua New Guinea. It extends from the eastern margin of Mount Lamington in the west to the Pacific Ocean coast in the east.

This coastal range represents a deeply dissected stratovolcano formed during the Quaternary period. It consists mainly of andesite and basaltic andesite but basalt and dacite are also present. Much of this volcanic massif formed during the Pleistocene epoch, but late-stage volcanism produced well-preserved cinder cones and explosion craters on the southern side of the range presumably during the Holocene epoch.

See also
List of volcanoes in Papua New Guinea

References

Mountain ranges of Papua New Guinea
Stratovolcanoes of Papua New Guinea
Pleistocene stratovolcanoes
Holocene stratovolcanoes
Oro Province